The Resurrection Man's Legacy is a collection of horror and dark fantasy short stories by American writer Dale Bailey. It was first published by Golden Gryphon Press in hardcover in November 2003. An ebook edition was released by Open Road Integrated Media in July 2014 under the alternate title The Resurrection Man's Legacy and Other Stories.

Summary
The book collects eleven short works of fiction by the author, together with an introduction by Barry N. Malzberg and story notes.

Contents
"Dale Bailey: In His Dominion" (Barry N. Malzberg)
"The Resurrection Man's Legacy" (from The Magazine of Fantasy & Science Fiction, July 1995)
"Death and Suffrage" (from The Magazine of Fantasy & Science Fiction, Feb. 2002)
"The Anencephalic Fields" (from The Magazine of Fantasy & Science Fiction, Jan. 2000)
"Home Burial" (from The Magazine of Fantasy & Science Fiction, Dec. 1994)
"Quinn's Way" (from The Magazine of Fantasy & Science Fiction, Feb. 1997)
"Touched" (from The Magazine of Fantasy & Science Fiction, Oct./Nov. 1993)
"The Census Taker" (from The Magazine of Fantasy & Science Fiction, Oct./Nov. 2003)
"Exodus" (from The Magazine of Fantasy & Science Fiction, July 1997)
"Cockroach" (from The Magazine of Fantasy & Science Fiction, Dec. 1998)
"Sheep's Clothing" (from The Magazine of Fantasy & Science Fiction, Oct./Nov. 1995)
"In Green's Dominion" (from Sci Fiction, June 5, 2002)
"Story Notes"

Reception
The collection was reviewed by Faren Miller in Locus #515, December 2003, Nick Gevers in Locus #516, January 2004, Warren G. Rochelle in SFRA Review #268, March 2004, Paula Guran in Cemetery Dance, #48, April 2004, and Colin Harvey in Strange Horizons, 23 January 2006.

Awards
The collection placed nineteenth in the 2004 Locus Poll Award for Best Collection.

"The Resurrection Man's Legacy" was nominated for the 1996 Nebula Award for Best Novelette.

"Death and Suffrage" won the 2002 International Horror Guild Award for Best Intermediate Form.

"Quinn's Way" placed twenty-second in the 1998 Locus Poll Award for Best Novelette.

"The Census Taker" was  nominated for the 2003 International Horror Guild Award for Best Intermediate Form and placed eighteenth in the 2004 Locus Poll Award for Best Novelette.

References

2003 short story collections
Horror short story collections
Fantasy short story collections